Evelyn Zabel Wilson (born December 6, 1959) is an associate justice of the Kansas Supreme Court.

Education 

Wilson graduated from Bethany College in 1982 with a bachelor's degree in business and from Washburn University School of Law in 1985.

Legal and teaching career 

She practiced law for 19 years in private practice. Her experience includes time as a managing partner, and time as an adjunct professor at Washburn University School of Law.

State court service 

She served Shawnee County as a District Judge from 2004 until her appointment as Chief Judge in 2014. She was reappointed Chief Judge in 2017.

Appointment to Kansas Supreme Court 

Wilson was one of seventeen applicants to apply for the position. On October 19, 2019, the Supreme Court Nominating Commission submitted Wilson's name, along with two others to the Governor. On December 16, 2019, Governor Laura Kelly appointed Wilson to the seat on the Kansas Supreme Court vacated by the retirement of Lee A. Johnson on September 8, 2019. She was sworn in on January 24, 2020.

Personal 
A native Kansan, Wilson was born in Smith Center, Kansas. Wilson and her husband, Mike, are members of First Lutheran Church in Topeka, where she also serves as a Stephen Minister.

References

External links 

1959 births
Living people
21st-century American judges
21st-century American women judges
American Lutherans
American women lawyers
Bethany College (Kansas) alumni
Kansas lawyers
Kansas state court judges
Justices of the Kansas Supreme Court
People from Smith Center, Kansas
Washburn University alumni
Washburn University faculty
American women academics